Harry C. Goode Jr. (March 6, 1938 – December 28, 2013) was a six-term mayor of Melbourne, Florida from 1979 to 1986 and 2004 to 2012. He was a member of the Florida House of Representatives for 14 years. He represented the 33rd district from 1986 to 1992, and the 31st district from 1992 to 2000. He served as a Democrat until April 27, 1998, when he switched parties and became a Republican. At the time of his death, he served on the Melbourne City Council, representing District 3.

Early life and family 
Goode was the son of Harry C. Goode Sr., who served on the Melbourne City Council and Katherine Goode. He was the grandson of Captain Alexander J. Goode. He was the great-grandson of Richard W. Goode, who served as the 12th mayor of Melbourne in 1905. He was the second-great-grandson of John Goode, one of the first settlers of Melbourne.

He was born in Melbourne, and was a graduate of Melbourne High School. He also attended Florida Southern College.

He served in the United States Army from 1961 to 1963.

He was owner and President of Harry Goode's Outdoor Shop on East New Haven Avenue until his retirement.

Political career 
He was elected mayor on November 13, 1979 and served until 1986. He was a member of the Florida League of Cities from 1979 to 1986. He was a member of the US Conference of Mayors from 1980 to 1986. He was a member of the Florida House of Representatives representing the 33rd district from 1986 to 1992 and the  31st district from 1992 to 2000.

He served as a Democrat until April 27, 1998, when he switched parties and became a Republican.

He was an unsuccessful candidate for the Florida Senate from the 15th district in 2000. He was an unsuccessful candidate for the Florida Senate from the 24th district in 2002.

He was elected mayor again on November 2, 2004 and served until 2012.

He served on the Melbourne City Council representing District 3 until his death on December 28, 2013.

Associations 
 Florida Institute of Technology Corporation, Board of Directors
 Space Coast Science Center, Board of Directors
 Space Coast Early Intervention Center, Advisory Board
 Friends of the Scrub Jay, Board Member
 Florida-Columbia Partners

Awards 
 Florida Association of Community Health Centers, 'Legislator of the Year Award', 1998
 Coastal Conservation Association of Florida, 'Florida Conservation Award', 1998
 Florida League of Cities, 'Defender of Home Rule Award', 1996
 East Central Florida Regional Planning Council, 'Legislative Appreciation Award', 1993
 Brevard Home Builders and Contractors Association Outstanding Legislative Efforts Award 1993
 Florida Association of Realtors, 'Legislator of the Year Award', 1991
 Florida Association of Retarded Citizens 'Outstanding Representative', 1990 
 Florida Conservation Association Legislative Session Award 1988
 Florida League of Cities, 'Quality Floridian Award', 1987

References 

1938 births
2013 deaths
Florida Democrats
Florida Republicans
Florida Southern College alumni
Rollins College alumni
Members of the Florida House of Representatives
Mayors of Melbourne, Florida
Florida city council members
Methodists from Florida
American merchants
Businesspeople from Florida
Melbourne High School alumni